Deh Chenar-e Sofla (also Romanized as Deh Chenār-e Soflá; also known as Deh Chenār, Deh Chenār-e Pā’īn, Shahrū’ī-ye Pā’īn, and Shahrūyeh) is a village in Khanmirza Rural District, Khanmirza District, Lordegan County, Chaharmahal and Bakhtiari Province, Iran. At the 2006 census, its population was 732, in 138 families. The village is populated by Lurs.

References 

Populated places in Lordegan County
Luri settlements in Chaharmahal and Bakhtiari Province